Faraday Future is an American start-up technology company focused on the development of electric vehicles, founded in 2014.

History

Founding
Faraday Future was founded by Chinese businessman Jia Yueting in April 2014 and is headquartered in Los Angeles, California, in the Harbor Gateway neighborhood adjacent to Carson, California. From its inception in 2014, the company grew to 1000 employees by January 2016.

The company is named for a founding principle of electric motor technology known as Faraday's law of induction, which in turn is named after English scientist Michael Faraday who discovered electromagnetic induction.

Factory plans
Faraday Future announced in November 2015 that it would invest up to $1 billion in its first manufacturing facility.

In December 2015, Faraday Future settled on a location in North Las Vegas for its manufacturing site, to be built by AECOM for $500 million. Construction began in April 2016 on infrastructure which Nevada agreed to build, but was suspended in November pending verification of Faraday Future's financial stability. The facility was spurred by a $215 million tax incentive, and a  railway spur in 2018 to the  future factory with 4,500 full-time employees.

On May 24, 2016, the City of Vallejo, California, announced a May 31 Special City Council meeting to consider an exclusive negotiating agreement. This represented the first step to bring Faraday Future to Mare Island. Following Karma Automotive's new plant in Moreno Valley, the project would be the second new automobile manufacturing facility to be built from the ground up in California within the last few years. It was projected to bring hundreds of millions of dollars in new investment to the local economy. On May 31, 2016, the City Council unanimously agreed to enter the 6-month agreement.

Due to plans to develop a production vehicle and plant in North Las Vegas, Faraday Future ended its exclusive agreement with the City of Vallejo in March 2017.

On July 10, 2017, the company announced it would no longer build a plant in North Las Vegas because of financial setbacks.

In August 2017, the company announced that it had signed a lease for a former Pirelli tire plant in Hanford, California. The company said that it could employ up to 1,300 people over time and build up to 10,000 cars a year at that location.

Concept vehicle and other planned vehicles
Faraday Future originally planned to launch its first fully electric vehicle in 2017, with the possibility of producing a larger range of vehicles over time.
The company has implied plans to explore other aspects of the automotive and technology industries, such as alternative ownership and usage models, in-vehicle content, and autonomous driving.

In July 2015, Motor Trend revealed tentative specifications for Faraday Future's proposed electric vehicle: it will have 15 percent higher specific energy than a Tesla Model S, it utilizes a multi cell solution where both individual cells and groups of cells can be replaced, and it will have a modular design for improved mass-production methods.

At the November 2015 LA Auto Show, former Head of Design Richard Kim discussed his interest in creating a vehicle that featured internet access, in-car entertainment, aromatherapy technology, and ergonomic interior design.

On January 4, 2016, at the US Consumer Electronics Show, Faraday Future revealed its concept vehicle, single seat sportscar FF ZERO1. Their video demonstrated how their Variable Platform Architecture (not in the concept vehicle) would allow for many body styles and battery configurations, but specific details or production schedules were not given for these potential car designs, only outlines of a crossover-like vehicle. Following the revelation, comments on social media expressed disappointment that the only design exhibited was a high-end concept race car that would never be produced.

Faraday Future planned to begin testing self-driving vehicles on California roads after winning approval from California in June, 2016.

Faraday Future unveiled its luxury model FF 91 130 kWh crossover vehicle, its first production vehicle, at the January 2017 US Consumer Electronics Show, with connected car features. Faraday received 64,124 reservations within the first 36 hours, despite a demonstration that did not go particularly well. It is claimed to accelerate  in less than 2.5 seconds, costing less than $300,000. Faraday Future plans several cars based on its Variable Platform Architecture.

In April 2019, Faraday Future announced a partnership with Chinese video game company, The9, to develop a minivan named the V9, exclusively for the China market.

Financial struggles
In late 2015, the company said that part of Faraday Future's revenue stream was expected to come from alternative, ancillary sources, the anticipated revenue structure being closer to that of the smartphone than to that of standard automobile sales.

By 2016, Faraday had been the subject of speculation voiced by ex-employees and government officials who expressed doubts about the company's finances. The company had failed to fund even relatively small escrow accounts, which led to some analysts doubting the company's financial solidity and overall investment strategy. In July 2016, several investment officers and managers expressed concern over the company's finances.

Faraday Future suspended work on its Nevada site in November 2016 until the first $300 million of a claimed $600 million in funding would be realized. The delay was criticized by Nevada officials, which Jia refuted. Among FF's many financial challenges as of late 2016 was providing surety for a $140 million loan when LeEco bought a $250 million piece of land in California from Yahoo.

The majority shareholder for the company was founder Jia Yueting. In late 2017, then CFO Stefan Krause and CTO Ulrich Kranz departed Faraday Future in a dispute with owner Jia over financing and the impending exhaustion of cash. Krause and Kranz founded Evelozcity (now called Canoo) in late 2017, a competing electric car maker, and poached former Faraday Future employees. Jia then took over as CEO of the company, securing a round of financing, when the company was facing depletion of their cash supply, and started paying off debts to suppliers. At the time, Jia was in debt  in China, with suppliers, creditors, and government, camping out at his Chinese company LeEco. The new financing involved US$1 billion for 25% of the outstanding shares in the company. In the followup to this round of financing, Jia had reiterated that the FF91 would debut on schedule, at the end of 2018.

In early 2018, Faraday Future acquired a $1.5 billion funding commitment from an undisclosed Hong Kong investor, with $550 million invested initially and the balance coming as the company met milestones. A report indicated that the new lifeline entailed a lien on the company's assets as collateral. By April 2018, Faraday Future secured a contract to build an assembly plant in a Guangzhou free zone area dedicated to the manufacture of smart equipment and new energy vehicles.

In May 2018, the company announced the appointment of Michael Agosta as vice president of finance for North America. Agosta was the previous CFO of Ford Motor Company Middle East and Africa. The announcement was seen as a commitment on the part of the organization to follow through on Jia Yueting's promise to produce its first EV, the FF 91, by 2018. An internal email sent by Jia Yueting showed that the vehicle was nearing delivery. This confirmed Agosta's prepared statement during his appointment that said "2018 is going to be an exceptional year for FF to deliver its first FF 91 to the market, and I will lead my team to make sure we are ready for this goal and beyond."

In August 2018, Faraday Future received US$854 million from Evergrande Group for a 45% stake in the company. However, in October 2018 the company sought to call off the deal, with Jia entering arbitration with Evergrande. Also in October 2018, the company announced layoffs, a 20% salary cut for all staff, and a revised salary of $1 for Jia. Co-founder Nick Sampson and senior vice president Peter Savagian resigned from the company following the announcement of layoffs. In December 2018 the company announced massive layoffs due to a cash crunch and financial pressure, and by the end of 2018 the staff was planned to be reduced by 40% (from 1000 to 600).

In March 2019, Faraday Future announced a new 50–50 joint venture with Chinese online game operator The9 to make EVs in China, with The9 announcing it would contribute up to $600 million for the project. In May 2019 it was reported that Faraday Future was undergoing restructuring and in June the company  fired dozens of employees on unpaid leave.

The company's founder Jia Yueting filed for personal bankruptcy in United States federal court in Delaware on October 14, 2019. Following Jia's personal bankruptcy, he  stepped down from his role as CEO of Faraday Future in order to assume a new position as the Chief Product and User Officer (CPUO). Jia was replaced as CEO by Carsten Breitfeld - former CEO at rival electric vehicle startup Byton.

Becoming publicly-traded
In January 2021, Faraday Future announced that the company would go public through a reverse merger with special-purpose acquisition company Property Solutions Acquisition Corp. The combined company would be valued at US$3.4 billion. Chinese automaker Geely was expected to become a strategic partner of Faraday Future. Faraday Future was expected to set up contract manufacturing operations in China through their partnership with Geely. Taiwanese manufacturer Foxconn was expected to serve as an additional strategic partner of Faraday Future in a yet to be determined capacity.

Faraday Future was listed on the Nasdaq stock exchange on July 22, 2021. The company is listed under the ticker symbol (NASDAQ:FFIE)

SEC subpoena
On March 31, 2022, the U.S. Securities and Exchange Commission subpoenaed several members of Faraday Future's management team over inaccurate statements made to investors. On November 26, 2022, the board voted to remove Carsten Breitfeld and appoint Xuefeng Chen as CEO.

Leadership
As of March 2023, the Board of Directors of Faraday Future is led by an executive team composed of:
 Xuefeng Chen (Global Chief Executive Officer)
 Matthias Aydt (Senior Vice President of Business Development and Product Definition)
 Chad Chen (Board Member)
 Adam He (Interim Board Chairman - Independent)
 Sheng Jie (Board Member)
 Tin Mok (Board Member)
 Ke Sun (Board Member)

Models
Faraday Future vehicle names start with "FF" for Faraday Future followed by a two digit number. The first digit indicates the market segment of the vehicle. A 9 would be a top-line product, with lower numbers indicating successively lower cost segments, except for 0, indicating a special car. When spelled-out as "zero", a concept car is indicated. The second digit indicates successive iterations or generations in that segment. Each element is pronounced separately, so that the FF91 is F-F-9-1 and not FF-ninety-one.

FF ZERO 1

The FFZERO1 concept vehicle was unveiled in 2016, at CES. The "Zero" spelling indicates the concept vehicle status, the "1" indicates the first such model. The specifications were never validated as the vehicle was only a clay and styrofoam model. The car would have a glass roof, and a racecar style head and neck support system, with oxygen and water feeds to the driver's helmet. The car would have four electric motors, one for each wheel, and be a single seater.

FF 01

The FF01 is a planned low-volume halo vehicle. The "0" indicates a halo car, and the "1" indicates the first such model.

FF 91

The FF91 (F-F-9-1) production model sedan was unveiled in 2017. The "9" indicates a top-of-the-line model, analogous to the Genesis G90 or Volvo S90. The "1" indicates the first model in this market segment. The rear doors are to be suicide doors, and all four doors would open automatically, like similar Tesla Motors vehicles. Also like Teslas, there is a large infotainment screen in the middle of the front dash console. It would also similarly have a limited autonomous driving mode. The FF91 would be equipped with smartphone app car access and key capability and facial recognition door locks.

In August 2018, the company completed the first pre-production FF91. Production was planned to start in Hanford, California, in late 2020.

FF 81

The FF81 was planned to be unveiled in 2018, though that never happened. It was planned to be a mid-sized SUV for the Chinese market. It is planned to be built in California.

701-EV
The Faraday Future Dragon Racing Penske 701-EV for the 2016–2017 Formula E season, is an all-electric open-wheel open-cockpit battery-electric racecar for the Faraday Future Dragon Racing Team, a collaboration between Faraday Future and Dragon Racing, a team founded by Jay Penske.

Motorsport

Pikes Peak International Hill Climb
Faraday raced a "beta level development" FF91 in the exhibition class race at the June 2017 annual Pikes Peak International Hill Climb in Colorado; the class also includes a performance-tuned Tesla Model S P100D. (In 2016, a Tesla Model S P90D set the production EV course record.)

Formula E

Faraday Future joined the FIA Formula E Championship for electric-powered cars through a collaboration with the existing Dragon Racing team, also American, for the series' third season, beginning in October 2016. Specifications for the car were released in November 2016.

In August 2017, due to lack of cash, Faraday Future reduced its participation in Formula E. It was unable to maintain a sponsorship role in Dragon Racing, leading to the loss of the FF logo on their cars. Faraday Future said it would maintain a technical relationship with the team. By November 2017, due to its cash-strapped state, Faraday Future dropped its partnership with Dragon Racing, exiting Formula E.

See also
 Plug-in electric vehicles in the United States
 Tesla, Inc.
 Fisker Inc.
 Karma Automotive
 Lucid Motors
 Polestar
 Rivian

References

External links

 

American companies established in 2014
Vehicle manufacturing companies established in 2014
Electric vehicle manufacturers of the United States
Motor vehicle manufacturers based in California
Car manufacturers of the United States
2014 establishments in California
Battery electric vehicle manufacturers
Manufacturing companies based in Los Angeles
Companies listed on the Nasdaq
Michael Faraday
Special-purpose acquisition companies